Tuel is a surname. Notable people with the surname include:

Jeff Tuel (born 1991), American football player
Laurent Tuel (born 1966), French film actor, director, and writer

See also
Tuell